The Awakening is the sixth studio album by German metalcore band Caliban, released on 25 May 2007. The album peaked at number 36 on the German album charts. A limited digipak edition was released, which also came with a bonus patch.
The album was released in the United States on 23 October 2007. This delay was because of the band's American label, Abacus Recordings, merging with Century Media.

Track listing 
All lyrics written by Andreas Dörner and all music written by Marc Görtz.

Personnel 
 Andreas Dörner – lead vocals
 Denis Schmidt – rhythm guitar, clean vocals
 Marc Goertz – lead guitar
 Marco Schaller – bass, backing vocals
 Patrick Grün – drums
 Anders Fridén – lead vocals on "I See the Falling Sky"

Credits
 Produced by Benny Richter
 Co-produced by Marc Goertz
 Mixed by Adam Dutkiewicz
 Music by Marc Goertz
 Music arranged by Caliban
 Lyrics by Andreas Dörner
 Keyboards and samples by Benny Richter
 Additional bass guitar by Bony Fertigmensch

Charts

References 

2007 albums
Caliban (band) albums
Roadrunner Records albums